Structural road design aims to ensure the road is strong enough for the expected number of vehicles in a certain number of years. The input of a calculation is the number expected of vehicles (e.g. 10,000,000) divided in groups (e.g. trucks, vans, cars) and the number of years that the road has to function before the road structure has to be fully renewed (e.g. 20 years).

The given example of 20 years does not mean that there is no maintenance during this period. There is a certain amount of maintenance, but it can be scheduled and is low.

For asphalt, the Shell pavement design method is often used.

See also 
 Road traffic control
 Geometric design of roads
Road surface

References

External links
https://web.archive.org/web/20110711165635/http://www.highwaysmaintenance.com/design.htm - The Idiots' Guide to Highways Maintenance
http://www.cshrp.org/products/techbr-23.pdf Pavement Structural Design Practices Across Canada
https://circle.ubc.ca/bitstream/handle/2429/26992/Haul_Road_Design_Guidelines.pdf?sequence=1 - GUIDELINES FOR MINE HAUL ROAD DESIGN

Pavements
Pavement engineering